Tony Greger Andrijevski (born 29 April 1973) is a Swedish former footballer who played as a forward. He was purchased by Malmö FF from Landskrona BoIS for the 1995 season. He also represented the Sweden U21 three times, scoring two goals. He was on the bench for an international friendly for the Sweden national team on 8 March 1995, but did not come off the bench as Sweden tied Cyprus 3–3.

References

1973 births
Association football forwards
Swedish footballers
Swedish expatriate footballers
Allsvenskan players
Danish Superliga players
Landskrona BoIS players
Malmö FF players
Odense Boldklub players
Trelleborgs FF players
Expatriate men's footballers in Denmark
Living people
Malmö FF non-playing staff
Allsvenskan managers
Swedish football managers
Swedish people of Macedonian descent
People from Landskrona Municipality
Footballers from Skåne County